Minh Hóa is a district in Quảng Bình province, in the North Central Coast region of Vietnam. This district is composed of one townlet (Quy Đạt, district capital) and 15 communes (xã): Xuân Hóa, Yên Hóa, Trung Hóa, Tân Hóa, Minh Hóa, Hồng Hóa, Hóa Tiến, Hóa Hợp, Hóa Sơn, Hóa Phúc, Hóa Thanh, Dân Hóa, Thượng Hóa, Trọng Hóa and Quy Hóa.

As of 2017 the district had a population of 50,708. The district covers an area of 1,401 km². The district capital lies at Quy Đạt.

References

Districts of Quảng Bình province